Josef Rusnak (born 25 November 1958) is a German screenwriter and director.

Career 

Rusnak's debut as writer and director was his 1984 film Cold Fever, which was awarded the Deutscher Filmpreis for best director that same year. Following this, he worked for French television and directed episodes of television series.

In 1997, he directed No Strings Attached, Quiet Days in Hollywood (starring Hilary Swank), and Schimanski: Die Schwadron, a TV film episode of the German crime series Schimanski.

In 1998, he worked as second unit director on Roland Emmerich's Godzilla. Emmerich then acted as producer on Rusnak's next film The Thirteenth Floor, an English language remake of the earlier German TV miniseries World on a Wire. Rusnak also wrote the screenplay.

Rusnak did not direct his next film until 2007's The Contractor starring Wesley Snipes. He worked with Snipes again on 2008's The Art of War II: Betrayal. In 2009 he also released the horror remake It's Alive, a remake of Larry Cohen's 1974 film. 

In 2010 he directed the drama Valerie starring Franka Potente. In 2012, he directed the film Beyond.

Rusnak was married to actress Claudia Michelsen until 2001. They have one daughter together, born 1996.

Filmography
 1984: Cold Fever
 1997: No Strings Attached
 1997: Quiet Days in Hollywood
 1997: Schimanski:  (TV)
 1999: The Thirteenth Floor
 2007: The Contractor
 2008: The Art of War II: Betrayal
 2009: It's Alive
 2010: Valerie  Small Lights
 2010: Perfect Life
 2012: Beyond
 2019: Berlin, I Love You

References

External links

1958 births
German mass media people
Living people
Best Director German Film Award winners